Richard William Nicholls (23 July 1875, in Crouch End, Middlesex – 22 January 1948, in Eastbourne, Sussex) was an English cricketer who played first-class cricket from 1896 to 1904.

Nicholls was a right-handed batsman who represented Middlesex. He also played first-class cricket for Marylebone Cricket Club (MCC), AJ Webbe's XI, PF Warner's XI and the Gentlemen of England. He scored 1,732 runs (average 16.81) in 72 first-class matches. He and Mickey Roche set a county record tenth-wicket stand of 230 against Kent at Lord's in 1899, during which he made his maiden century, scoring 154.

References

External links
 

1875 births
1948 deaths
English cricketers
Marylebone Cricket Club cricketers
Middlesex cricketers
Gentlemen of England cricketers
P. F. Warner's XI cricketers
A. J. Webbe's XI cricketers
People from Crouch End